The 1959 NAIA Soccer Championship was the inaugural tournament held by the NAIA to determine the national champion of men's college soccer among its members in the United States.

Pratt defeated Elizabethtown in the championship match, 4–3 (after two overtime periods), to win their first NAIA national title. The final was played at Slippery Rock State College in Slippery Rock, Pennsylvania.

Bracket

See also  
 NCAA Men's Soccer Tournament
 1959 NCAA Soccer Championship

References 

NAIA championships
NAIA
NAIA
1959 in sports in Pennsylvania